Videoland may refer to:

Videoland (Netherlands), a Dutch video on demand service owned by RTL Nederland
Movie Gallery, a game and rental company based in Dothan, Alabama
Videoland Television Network, a media company based in Taiwan
Alice in Videoland, a Swedish pop group
Videoland, the world where the Captain N: The Game Master series takes place